Boccia at the 2020 Summer Paralympics in Tokyo, Japan, took place at the Ariake Gymnastics Centre. There were expected to be 116 qualification slots (34 females, 82 gender free) across eight mixed events: four individual events, two pairs events and one team event.

While the 2020 Summer Olympic and Paralympic Games were postponed to 2021 due to the COVID-19 pandemic, they kept the 2020 name and were held from 24 August to 5 September 2021.

Classification

When competing in boccia at national or international level, the athletes were competing in events with different classifications, based on level of physical disability.

 BC1 - Cerebral palsy.
Locomotor dysfunction affecting the whole body.
Use hands or feet to propel the ball into play
May be assisted by an aide.
 BC2 - Cerebral palsy.
Locomotor dysfunction affecting the whole body
Use hands to propel the ball into play
Not assisted by an aide.
 BC3 - Cerebral palsy or another disability.
Locomotor dysfunction in all four limbs.
Use the help of a ramp to propel the ball into play.
Assisted by an aide (ramper).
 BC4 - Not cerebral palsy, but another disability, for example muscular dystrophy or tetraplegia.
Locomotor dysfunction in all four limbs
Use hands to propel the ball into play
Not assisted by an aide.

Qualification

Schedule

Medals

Medalists

References

External links
Results book 

2020
2020 Summer Paralympics events